Marcellus Graeme Boss (January 21, 1901 – March 21, 1967) was an interim Governor of Guam from November 14, 1959, until his resignation on August 22, 1960.

Boss first entered Guamanian administration with a 1957 appointment by President Dwight D. Eisenhower to the post of Secretary of Guam. He also served as a Republican member of the Kansas State Senate prior to becoming involved in the government of Guam. He was city clerk and city attorney of Kiowa, Kansas, and had a thirty-year law career in Columbus, Kansas. He died of a heart attack on March 21, 1967, and was buried at the City Cemetery in Columbus, Kansas.

References

External links 
 Marcellus G. Boss at ourcampaigns.com

Governors of Guam
Republican Party Kansas state senators
People from Kiowa, Kansas
People from Columbus, Kansas
Kansas lawyers
1901 births
1967 deaths
Secretaries of Guam
Guamanian Republicans
20th-century American politicians
20th-century American lawyers